Love Hell or Right (Da Come Up) is an album by the hip hop producer DJ Mathematics, who is a DJ with Wu-Tang Clan.

Completely mixed, arranged and produced by Mathematics himself, Love, Hell or Right was released August 26, 2003, on his own Quewisha Records label in conjunction with High Times Records, and it went on to sell 30,000 units. It was released in CD, vinyl and cassette tape formats.

The title is a reference to the Nation of Gods and Earths's Supreme Alphabet, in which the letter "L" is seen to stand for "Love Hell or Right".

Track listing
Note: Artists marked with an asterisk (*) are not affiliated with the Wu-Tang Clan.

 "Love Hell or Right (Da Intro)"
 "Pimpology 101" (Buddah Bless*)
 "Thank U (Da DJ's Version)" (Method Man, Ghostface Killah and Angela Neal*)
 "Message to a Blackman (Skit)" (Queen-Shatiyah*)
 "Juscantluv" (Eyes Low*)
 "Return of Da Cobra (Skit)" (Buddah Bless*)
 "Hav Mercy" (Killa Sin and La the Darkman)
 "Respect Mine" (Method Man, Raekwon and Cappadonna)
 "Da Heist (Skit)" (Starking*, LEO*, Karim*, and Mouth*)
 "Gangsta" (Logic*, Nemy*, Mad Man* and Eyes Low*)
 "Da Great Siege" (RZA)
 "Message from a Blackman (Skit)"
 "Real Talk (Pop's Song)" (Pop Poppa Don*)
 "Hip Hop 101" (Prodigal Sunn, H-Speed*, Born Justice, Shacronz and Allah Real)
 "Queens Day '88" (Pop Poppa Don* and Eyes Low*)
 "Alwayz N.Y." (Masta Killa, U-God, Inspectah Deck, Buddah Bless* and Icarus Da Don*)
 "Gun Talk" (Street Life and Buddah Bless*)
 "...On Da Radio (Skit)" (Ghostface Killah)
Also produced by The RZA
 "Pimp Party" (Almighty Infinite*, Eyes Low*, Boy Big* and Buddah Bless*)
 "Outro"
 "Da Way We Were"

Mathematics (producer) albums
2003 albums
Albums produced by Mathematics